Bohyeonsa is a temple located in Yeongcheon, Gyeongsangbuk-do, South Korea.

See also
Bohyeonsan

References 

Buddhist temples in South Korea
Yeongcheon
Buildings and structures in North Gyeongsang Province